Adam Cook (born 14 November 2000) is an Australian professional rugby league footballer who plays as a  for the North Queensland Cowboys in the NRL. 

He previously played for the Canberra Raiders in the National Rugby League.

Background
Born in Charters Towers, Queensland, Cook played his junior rugby league for Townsville Brothers and attended Ignatius Park College.

Playing career

Early career
In 2016, Cook played for the Townsville Blackhawks Cyril Connell Cup side, starting at halfback in their Grand Final win over the Souths Logan Magpies. In 2017, he moved up to the club's Mal Meninga Cup side. In 2018, after starting the season in the Mal Meninga Cup, Cook moved up to the Blackhawks' Hastings Deering Colts side, starting at halfback in their Grand Final loss to the Norths Devils. In 2019, Cook joined to the Blackhawks' Queensland Cup squad, but did not play a game, spending the entire season with the Colts team, where he was named the club's under-20 Player of the Year.

In October 2019, Cook signed with the Canberra Raiders.

2020
In round 20 of the 2020 NRL season, Cook made his NRL debut for Canberra against the Cronulla-Sutherland Sharks.

References

External links 
 NSWRL profile

2000 births
Australian rugby league players
Canberra Raiders players
Rugby league fullbacks
Rugby league players from Queensland
Living people